Ralph Richeson (July 6, 1952 – October 27, 2015) was an American painter and actor best known for his role of Richardson, the fictional Grand Central Hotel's disheveled, eccentric cook on the HBO television series, Deadwood.

Early life
Ralph Richeson was born on July 6, 1952 in Peru, Indiana, to Elsie Crisci Olson Richeson and Ralph Woodson Richeson, Jr.

Richeson had two brothers, Robert and Harry.

Acting career
Richeson was originally an extra on Deadwood, before the show's producer, David Milch, noticed him and gave him one line, which became Richeson's first onscreen credit. This led to Richeson's recurring role as the disheveled, eccentric cook in 20 of Deadwoods 36 episodes. The character was fascinated with deer antlers, which he possessed in most of his scenes on the show. Deadwood aired on HBO for three seasons, from 2004 to 2006.

Richeson was well liked on the set of Deadwood. Jim Beaver, who portrayed gold prospector Whitney Ellsworth on the show, later wrote in a 2015 Facebook post, "I don’t think there was anyone remotely involved in the show who didn’t love Ralph."

In addition to Deadwood, Richeson's film roles included a prison convict in Hancock (2008), starring Will Smith, and an "overworked homeless man" in The Revenant (2009). He was also cast as the "ghoulish man" in the Parks and Recreation episode, "The Master Plan" (2010).

Death
Richeson died from heart failure on October 27, 2015, aged 63, at Palmdale Regional Medical Center in Palmdale, California. He was survived by one brother, Harry; a sister-in-law, Linda; four nieces, Tatia Richeson Hyde, Jodi Richeson, Michelle Richeson, Ashley Richeson; and a nephew, Jason Richeson. He was preceded in death by his older brother Robert Richeson and his nephew Robert Richeson II.

Filmography

References

External links

1952 births
2015 deaths
American male television actors
American male film actors
20th-century American painters
People from Peru, Indiana
21st-century American painters
Male actors from Indiana
Painters from Indiana